Marratxí is a municipality in the Raiguer region of Majorca, one of the Balearic Islands of Spain. As of 2005, it has a population of 28,237 and an area of 54 km2.  It is also a station on the Majorca rail network. It became a municipality on 9 November 1932.

There is no central town in the municipality; instead, it is an agglomeration of the villages of Pont d'Inca (16,518), Pla de na Tesa (3,304), Pòrtol (2,640) and Sa Cabaneta (5,748) - where the district council buildings are located.

Economy
The local economy is dominated by agriculture; however, significant employment is provided by traditional pottery manufacture and the large shopping complex at Pont d’Inca. 

Marratxí's population has increased rapidly since the mid-1990s due to the proliferation of new developments around the historical villages, since the municipality has good road—and to a lesser extent rail—links to nearby Palma.

Notable landmarks
Marratxí Church dates to the early 18th century, built during the Cotoner era. The Caulles Festival Park lies to the south.

The first civil airfield on Majorca was Aeródromo de Son Bonet, which is located between Pont d’Inca and Pla de Na Tesa.

References

External links
Official website

Municipalities in Mallorca
Populated places in Mallorca